The Ground Master 200 (GM200) is a medium range AESA 3D radar manufactured by Thales Group. This radar is part of the Ground Master family (like GM400α, GM60, GM200 MM/A & MM/C). 

The GM200 operates as an air surveillance gap filler or a sensor for an air defence system. The GM200 also features a surface channel and a Rocket/Artillery/Mortar sense and warn capability.

The system fits in a 20 ft ISO shelter and weighs less than ten tons. It includes power generator unit, mast, and room for 2 workstations with a set of radio voice and data communications. The GM200 is transportable by road, rail, tactical aircraft (C-130 type) or helicopter. The GM200 can be set up in 15 minutes and be operated remotely or locally.

Main characteristics

Detection domain 

 Instrumented range: 
 250 km Surveillance 
 100 km Engagement
 Ceiling: up to 80,000 feet
 Elevation coverage: 70°

Key Features 

 Update rate: up to 1.5s
 S-Band
 GaN transmitters
 Artificial Intelligence inspired algorithms 
 Electronic Counter Counter Measures (ECCM) capabilities
 Full digital stacked beam
 Full doppler waveforms
 GaN Technology

Detection Performances 

 Air Breathing Targets (ABTs)
 Helicopters (including hovering during pop-up phase)
 Cruise Missiles (CMs)
 Sea surface targets
 Rockets
 Artillery and Mortars
 UAV from Class I (Mini) up to Class IV (HALE).

References

External links
 Ground Master 200 - Thales Group

Ground radars
Thales Group
Military radars of France